The inauguration of Muhammadu Buhari as the 15th President of Nigeria, and 4th President in the fourth Nigerian Republic took place on Friday, 29 May 2015. It marked the beginning of the first term of Muhammadu Buhari as President following the 2015 general election.

The Federal Government declared 29 May a public holiday. More than fifty representatives from foreign governments were expected to attend the inauguration. The government intended to spend less than ₦2 billion (US$10 million) for the ceremony.

The Presidential Election Petitions Tribunal has dismissed a petition filed by the Hope Democratic Party (HDP) seeking to restrain President Muhammadu Buhari from being sworn in for a second term on May 29, 2019.

The Independent National Electoral Commission (INEC) declared Buhari winner of the February 23 presidential election with a total of 15,191,847 votes.

However, the HDP and its presidential candidate, Ambrose Oworu, filed a petition before the tribunal to nullify the election on the grounds of INEC's non-compliance with the provisions of the Electoral Act.

While delivering judgement on Wednesday, May 22, 2019, the three-member panel of the tribunal ruled that the petitioners' application lacked merit and dismissed it.
Pulse.ng

Background
Buhari won the presidential election by more than 2.5 million votes.

On 17 May 2015, Buhari's campaign spokesperson said that following the inauguration, the President "would simply be addressed as Muhammadu Buhari, President and Commander-in-Chief of the Armed Forces of the Federal Republic of Nigeria." He would also not prefer to be addressed as "Mr., Alhaji or Mallam". Buhari's official portrait was also unveiled on the same day.

On 24 May 2015, the All Progressives Congress issued a statement saying that outgoing President Goodluck Jonathan was "handing over a nation in deep crisis" and that there was "no electricity, no fuel, workers are on strike, billions are owed to state and federal workers, $60 billion are owed in national debt and the economy is virtually grounded".

On 26 May 2015, the National Union of Nigerian Students issued a statement saying that South African President Jacob Zuma was not welcome due to his "poor handling" of the recent xenophobic attacks against foreign nationals in his country. It also stated that there is "no point felicitating with a people who clearly do not matter much to you" and his visit will only amount to pretence.

On 27 May 2015, Premium Times reported that the ruling People's Democratic Party had deliberately received the bulk of the 5,000 invitation cards as there were plans to allegedly boo the outgoing president. They also didn't want him to be embarrassed and instead give him a "cheerful exit". Following appeal made by many to probe the outgoing administration, President Jonathan during a valedictory session of the Federal Executive Council, said that any future probe should be "extended beyond [his] administration. Otherwise.. it [would] be witch-hunt".

Suleiman Hashimu walked 750 km from Lagos to Abuja, fulfilling his vow that he had made if General Buhari won the presidency. It took him 18 days to trek the route. He had taken with him ₦100,000 ($500) but only spent ₦3,500 as he was catered for by the people along the way.

Pre-inaugural events

Inaugural events

Swearing-in-Ceremony
The official swearing-in ceremony took place at Eagle Square in Abuja, the Federal Capital Territory from 0800 hours (UTC+1). Chief Justice Mahmud Mohammed administered the oath of office taken by President elect Buhari.
Vice President Yemi Osinbajo was sworn in at 10:41 AM. President Muhammadu Buhari was sworn in at 10:51 AM after which he delivered his inaugural speech.

Inauguration speech (excerpt)

Inauguration Luncheon
A luncheon was held at the State House Banquet Hall at midday. President Buhari left the programme midway in order to attend the Friday weekly prayers.

Inauguration Gala
A gala was held in the evening.

Attendance
Invitations were sent to 54 African countries and other nations. Outgoing First Lady Patience Jonathan did not attend the ceremony. Former Nigerian Heads of State who were in attendance included General Yakubu Gowon, President Shehu Shagari (ousted by Buhari), General Ibrahim Babangida (deposed Buhari), Interim President Ernest Shonekan, General Abdulsalami Abubakar and General Olusegun Obasanjo.

Dignitaries

Spouses of HOSG

Government representatives

International organisations

Controversies

Kenyan President Uhuru Kenyatta was scheduled to attend the ceremony but cancelled following outrage from Kenyans when details of his 84-member entourage was leaked. The Kenyan Foreign Affairs Principal Secretary denied these reports and described the list as fake. Citizen News reported that the two-day trip would have cost at least KSh.  (about US$200,000) in allowances and airfare. Instead, Deputy President William Ruto accompanied by ten officials, represented the president.

At the inauguration ceremony, Sahara Reporters' Adeola Fayehun asked Zimbabwean President Robert Mugabe when he would be stepping down. Fayehun asked him if there was democracy in Zimbabwe and that it was time for him to step down. Mugabe's spokesperson George Charamba described the reporters as "activists with cameras" and that they "took advantage of protocol restrictions that were imposed on delegations." Zimbabwe's Information Minister Jonathan Moyo tweeted that the reporters were "political activists masquerading as journalists who imagine their country as a model of democracy." Moyo also stated that "free countries have rules including diplomatic courtesy not the display of Boko Haram journalism."

References

External links

 www.thisisbuhari.com
 Programme of Activities, State House Nigeria.
 

Presidential inaugurations
2015 in Nigeria
Politics of Nigeria
2015 in politics
Muhammadu Buhari
May 2015 events in Nigeria